Michael Feldman (born March 14, 1949) is an American radio personality. He is the host of Michael Feldman's Whad'Ya Know?, formerly a radio show distributed by Public Radio International and now a podcast. His former announcer, Jim Packard, referred to him as "The Sage of Wisconsin." He has given himself the title of "Producer Internationale," and also refers to Public Radio International on-air as "The International House of Radio."

Raised in Milwaukee, Wisconsin, Feldman graduated from the University of Wisconsin–Madison with a degree in English in 1970. He worked as a teacher at Malcolm Shabazz City High School in Madison, Wisconsin, before finding work at radio station WORT. Soon after, he worked as a cab driver before coming back to broadcasting, first at Wisconsin Public Radio (WPR) in Madison, then at WGN (AM). His show was canceled by WGN in 1984 and he returned to WPR in 1985 to produce and host Michael Feldman's Whad'Ya Know?, in conjunction with Wisconsin Public Radio for Public Radio International. In 2015 Whad'ya Know? celebrated its 30th anniversary, and is nearing its 1,000th broadcast.

Books and other media 

Feldman is the author of several books: Wisconsin Curiosities: Quirky Characters, Roadside Oddities & Other Offbeat Stuff; Something I Said?: Innuendo and Out the Other; Thanks for the Memos; Glad You Asked: Intriguing Names, Facts, and Ideas For the Curious-Minded; Whad'ya Know, Test Your Knowledge; Whad'ya Know?; and Whad'ya Knowledge.

Feldman has produced three CD compilations of his radio show, Roadkill! The Best of Michael Feldman's Whad'ya Know... On the Road and Why Not: Best of Michael Feldman's Whad'ya Know, The First 25 Are the Hardest, a celebration of 25 years of Whad'ya Know, and the music CD Her Country: The Songs of Michael Feldman with John Sieger and the Skeletons.  
Feldman also produces a podcast featuring interviews from Whad'ya Know?

Personal

Feldman is married, has two daughters, and lives in the Madison area, where the show is usually staged.

References

External links
Biography at the Whad'Ya Know? website
Profile at About.com

American public radio personalities
American humorists
Public Radio International personalities
People from Madison, Wisconsin
Radio personalities from Milwaukee
University of Wisconsin–Madison College of Letters and Science alumni
Wisconsin Public Radio
1949 births
Living people